The Evangelical Reformed Cemetery in Warsaw is a historic Calvinist Protestant cemetery in Wola, a district in the west of Warsaw, Poland.

Details
The cemetery was established in 1792 and is located in the Wola district. The cemetery bore witness to many historical events: fighting on its premises took place during the Kościuszko Uprising of 1794, the November Uprising (1830–1831) and the Warsaw Uprising (1944). The fence, the monuments and the architecture of the cemetery were all destroyed during the last of the afore-mentioned events, and were rebuilt in the second half of the 20th century.
Despite the historical turmoil, many monuments of great artistic value have somehow managed to survive and still stand today - one of them being the Kronenberg Chapel, which is included in the National Historical Monument Register.

The Evangelical Reformed Cemetery is maintained by the Polish Reformed Church, but the cemetery is ecumenical and accepts interments from other Protestant denominations and members of the Church of England (Anglicans).

A monument dedicated to those killed during the Nazi occupation of Poland is made out of the rubble of destroyed tombstones.

Selected notable burials
A few of the notables buried here are:
 Salomon Musonius (1724–1790), the first provost of the Polish Reformed Church parish in Warsaw
 Katarzyna Sowińska (1776–1860), the wife of General Józef Sowiński (killed in the November Uprising)
 Ludwik Wincenty Norblin (1836–1914), notable Polish entrepreneur
 Lucyna Ćwierczakiewiczowa (1829–1901),  writer, journalist and author of Polish cookery books
 Stanisław Kronenberg (1846–1894), Polish financier
 Jeremi Przybora (1915–2004), Polish poet, writer, actor and singer
 Stefan Żeromski (1864–1925), Polish writer
 Anna German (1936–1982), Polish singer of German/Dutch origin singer
 Józef Simmler (1823–1868), Polish painter and artist

Gallery

External links 

 Cmentarz Ewangelicko-Reformowany
 Cmentarz ewangelicko-reformowany w Warszawie

Cemeteries in Warsaw
Protestant Reformed cemeteries
Wola